Our Lady of Ransom Church is a Catholic church located at Kanyakumari, Tamil Nadu, India.

Location 
Kanyakumari village is situated in the District of Kanyakumari in the southernmost part of the Indian subcontinent (also referred as The Lands End). The Kanyakumari Parish almost coincides with the civil village of Kanyakumari. It is closely associated with the mainstream Catholic Faith in India. According to census 2011, the Kanyakumari district comprising 48.74% of Christians in Tamil Nadu.

History 
The tomb stones unearthed at Kumari Muttom, near Kanyakumari contain evidences to show that Catholics were living there for many centuries. The tomb stones dated 1496 contain the edict of the local ruler granting tax exemptions to the residents of Kumari Muttom and authorizing levy of a cess from the fishermen in Kumari Muttom. The aggregate income thus generated had to be used to keep the lights of the church burning.

In 1542 when St. Francis Xavier came to Cape Comerin (Kanyakumari) he found ‘Our Lady of Delights Grotto’, at Kanyakumari. Then it became a centre for mission activities of the Jesuits from Thoothoor to Ramanathapuram.

It is believed that Our Lady of Delights Grotto, in which St. Francis Xavier prayed, later became the church of Our Lady of Ransom.  Our Lady of Ransom is the Patron of the congregation in Spain which redeemed the Christians from the Muslim invasion in the year 1218. The people of Kanyakumari combined the name Ransom with Delight and call their patron Alangara Upakara Matha.

Old church of 18th century 

A small thatched church was upgraded to a big church of Roman architecture was constructed in 1700 AD.  A statue of Mother Mary made during 16th century derived from Rome to Kanyakumari.  A golden altar was developed and the statue of Mother Mary was placed in the centre of the altar and venerated by the name of Alangara matha. The statue of St. Joseph and St. Francis Xavier were placed in the right side and left side respectively. There are wooden carvings depicting the coronation of Mary as queen of heaven and earth. Intricately carved depictions of angels playing the musical instruments like violin, flute and drums in the upper and side adorn the altar.  Jesus Christ inviting his disciples for ministries and forgiving Mary Magdalene were depicted in the side of the altar. Cardinals, a Pope, and soldiers having foliage in their hand are depicted.  There are carvings of 12 disciples of Jesus Christ. A lamb lying on the Holy Bible is depicted in the lower portion of the altar. The old church remains part of the new church.

History of the flagstaff 
In 1917, a foreign (German) merchant ship carrying coal was grounded on the sandy shore of Leepuram, Kanyakumari, and could not be refloated; it was abandoned and sold at auction to Kayathan Villavarayan, a merchant from Tuticorin. He donated the iron mast to Our Lady of Ransom Church, Kanyakumari. The kattumarams of Kanyakumari were brought to Leepuram to take the mast to Kanyakumari.

When the mast was loaded on the kattumarams, the mast together with the kattumarams sank, then began to float. The mast was taken to Kanyakumari by road, it was fitted into a bore hole in a stone and fixed in place with molten lead.

New Church 
The foundation for the new church was laid out by Fr. John Consolvez on 31 May 1900. Mr. Pakiam Pillai of the Vadakkankulam was the architect, and he modeled the church based on ancient Gothic Art and culture. The new Church is 153 feet in length, 53 feet in width, and 153 feet in height. The numbers 153 and 53 represent the prayers of the Holy Rosary

Dimensions 
The church is constructed by the model of ancient Gothic Art and culture. The length of the new Church is 153 feet, breadth 53 feet and height of the main
tower is 153 feet.  This entire dimension depicts the beads of the Holy Rosary. There are 12 towers in the church which depict 12 disciples of Jesus Christ.

Porch and other doors 
The porch ends with a pointed arch. The church contains totally 7 doors, 3 as porch and 2 doors facing north and 2 doors facing south which depict the 7 fruits of the Holy Spirit.

Several clustered Gothic piers provide support to the main tower. Inside the church, there are compound pillars which resemble vertical shafts that provide support to the ceiling which is made with nave vault and transverse arches.

Two side towers attached with the main tower act as belfry containing the church bells which have been imported from Italy in 1900 AD. The bell was used for several decades to signal time.

Gigantic statues of St. Thomas and St. Francis Xavier are placed on the main tower. The veneration of Mother Mary is celebrated every year from 1–31 May.

Developments 
The church has had several parish priests.

In 1914 Msgr. Vincent Fdo celebrated the First Mass in the newly built Church. In 1956 Rev. Fr.  Josaphath Maria completed the front elevation and the pinnacles.
In 2006 the parish celebrated the golden jubilee of the erection of the golden cross and 106th year of laying the foundation of the church.

Our Lady of Ransom Church 
When entering to the church one can see a beautiful statue of Mother Mary got from Italy and clad in a sari – like in most [South Indian] churches and a little Cross on the altar.  The beautiful paintings of four disciples of Jesus Christ and writers of New Testament of the Bible namely Mark, Matthew, Luke and John are exquisite on the main altar and the Mother Mary statue is located in the middle of the main altar. The colourful light patterns thrown by the stained glass windows on side of the church gives a rainbow appearance inside the church. The Mother Mary statue situated in the old Church and is from Rome and is the main attraction of this church.

Annual Feast and Golden car procession 
Every year the feast of Our Lady of Ransom is celebrated for 10 days in the month of December. The feast of Our Lady of Ransom begins with the flag hoisting on the following Friday immediately after the feast of St. Francis Xavier, Kottar which falls on 3 December. The first day of the feast begins with the flag hoisting.  During the festival, every morning festival mass is celebrated and in the evening there will be benediction with special prayers and preaching. On the eight day evening Corpus Christi Procession is held. The ninth day evening has special vespers and celebrations held. The culmination of the feast is the golden car procession: two golden cars are taken on the 9th and 10th days of the feasts. Our Lady of delight is taken in procession in the 1st car, which was made in 1798. St. Joseph, the spouse of Mary is taken in procession in the 2nd car, which was made in 1833.

Golden cars 
Two golden chariots dedicated to Our lady of Ransom and St. Joseph have been constructed during 1798 AD and 1833 AD respectively. The Golden car procession on the main street around the church is convened during the annual festival of Our Lady of Ransom. During the golden car procession, the traditional Nathaswaram music and peculiar praising of Mother Mary by an art of pala padal. Pilgrims from different places of the country and the state visit the church during the annual feast.

At present Kanyakumari parish has 2,850 Catholic families, which are organised into 88 Basic Christian Communities. The total Number of the Catholics amounts to 12,839. There are 21 pious associations. The parish established an elementary school in the year 1882 and now 540 children are studying in the vernacular language. The parish has a Higher Secondary School established in the year 1921, where 1350 students are studying.

References 

 Stephen Neill (2004). A History of Christianity in India: The Beginnings to Ad 1707. Cambridge University Press. p. 29. .
 Dr. Issac Arul Dhas G,'`Kumari Mannil Christhavam' (Tamil), Scott Christian College, Nagercoil, 2010, Page 7
 Dr. Issac Arul Dhas, 'Kumari Mannil Christhavam'(Tamil), Page 7.
 A. E. Medlycott (1 January 2005). India and the Apostle Thomas: An Inquiry, with a Critical Analysis of the Acta Thomae. Gorgias Press LLC. .
 "Census of India, 2001".Census Bureau, Government of India. 2001.

External links 
 Parish website

Gallery 

Roman Catholic churches in Tamil Nadu
Gothic Revival church buildings in India
Roman Catholic churches completed in 1914
20th-century Roman Catholic church buildings in India
Churches in Kanyakumari district